Korkut is a district of Turkey.

Korkut or KORKUT may refer to:
 Korkut, the central character of the Turkic epic Book of Dede Korkut
 Korkut (name), a Turkish name (including a list of people with the name)
 Korkut, Gümüşhacıköy, a village in Turkey
 KORKUT, a Turkish military vehicle